Shlyakhovsky is a rural locality (a khutor) in Krasnolipovskoye Rural Settlement, Frolovsky District, Volgograd Oblast, Russia. The population was 142 as of 2010.

Geography 
Shlyakhovsky is located 29 km southeast of Prigorodny (the district's administrative centre) by road. Krasnye Lipki is the nearest rural locality.

References 

Rural localities in Frolovsky District